The 1982 Calgary Stampeders finished in 3rd place in the West Division with a 9–6–1 record. They appeared in the West Semi-Final where they lost to the Winnipeg Blue Bombers.

Regular season

Season Standings

Season schedule

Playoffs

West Semi-Final

Awards and records

1982 CFL All-Stars
OT – Lloyd Fairbanks, CFL All-Star
LB – Danny Bass, CFL All-Star
DB – Ray Odums, CFL All-Star

Western All-Stars
RB – James Sykes, CFL Western All-Star
WR – Willie Armstead, CFL Western All-Star
OT – Lloyd Fairbanks, CFL Western All-Star
LB – Danny Bass, CFL Western All-Star
DB – Ray Odums, CFL Western All-Star

References

Calgary Stampeders seasons
1982 Canadian Football League season by team